Tony Wall is an Australian former professional rugby league footballer who played in the 1990s. He played for Western Suburbs in the ARL competition and for Paris Saint-Germain in the Super League.

Playing career
Wall made his first grade debut for Western Suburbs in round 4 of the 1995 ARL season against Parramatta at Campbelltown Sports Stadium. After spending one season with Western Suburbs, Wall joined Paris Saint-Germain in the Super League for 1997. At the end of 1997, Paris Saint-Germain were liquidated and Wall did not play first grade rugby league again.

References

1971 births
Western Suburbs Magpies players
Paris Saint-Germain Rugby League players
Australian rugby league players
Rugby league wingers
Living people